Prenestino-Centocelle is the 19th quartiere of Rome (Italy), identified by the initials Q. XIX. It belongs to the Municipio VII. The name is derived from the Via Praenestina and the fortress Centrocelle Centum Cellae of Constantine the Great. It has 53,492 inhabitants and has an area of 2.0816 km2.

It forms the zone urban zone designated with the code 7.a, with 56,408 inhabitants and an area of 3 km2.

References

External links